Fatutaka, Fatu Taka or Patu Taka (also known as Fataka and Mitre Island) is a small high island in the Solomon Islands province of Temotu in the south-west Pacific Ocean.
Fatutaka and Anuta were discovered by Admiral Edward Edwards in 1791.

Human activities
The island's soil is rocky, and not especially fertile, although it has in the past been used as a gardening location for the people of Anuta.

The population of Anuta, the closest inhabited island, regularly sail to Fatutaka to eat and collect sea-birds and their eggs.
The birds of Fatukaka have never been surveyed although the presence of Frigatebird, Eastern Reef Egret, Pacific Imperial Pigeon, and Emerald Dove have been reported.

Geology
Fatutaka is one of numerous volcanic highs, islands and banks, in the north-western North Fiji Basin south of the fossil Vitiaz Trench (10°30'–19°S, 169°–174°E). Anuta and Fatutaka consist of basaltic lavas and andesitic breccias.

In the 1970s the formation of Anuta and Fatutaka 2.2  was attributed to volcanism in the Vitiaz island arc during the initial back-arc opening of the North Fiji Basin.  The Vitiaz Arc volcanoes were, however, displaced in an earlier episode and the formation of the islands is now attributed to renewed volcanism associated with a change in motion of the Pacific Plate 2 Ma.

See also
 Oceania
 Pacific Islands
 Santa Cruz Islands

References

Notes

Sources

 
 
 
 
 
 
 

Islands of the Solomon Islands
Volcanoes of the Solomon Islands